Atolmis is a genus of tiger moths in the family Erebidae. The genus was erected by Jacob Hübner in 1819.

Species
 Atolmis rubricollis Linnaeus, 1758 – red-necked footman
 Atolmis unifascia Hampson, 1901

Former species
 Atolmis flavicollis, now Gnamptonychia flavicollis (Druce, 1885)

References

Lithosiina
Moth genera